İpek Özkök (born 17 April 1982 in Istanbul) is a Turkish actress and model.

Career
Of Circassian descent, Özkök began modeling in 2003 and appeared in many commercials. A gifted diatonic button accordion player, she founded an all-female ensemble, "Warada Mızıka", dedicated to Circassian music.

Filmography

References

External links
 

1982 births
Living people
Turkish film actresses
Turkish television actresses
Turkish female models
Turkish people of Circassian descent